Vigil in the Night is a 1940 RKO Pictures drama film based on the 1939 serialized novel Vigil in the Night by A. J. Cronin. The film was produced and directed by George Stevens and stars Carole Lombard, Brian Aherne and Anne Shirley.

Plot
In Great Britain, nurse Anne Lee takes the blame for a fatal error made by her sister Lucy, also a nurse, and is forced to leave the hospital where they both work.  She moves to a large city, where she procures a job at another hospital and falls in love with Dr. Robert Prescott. Overcoming obstacles and personal tragedy along the way, Anne and Prescott work together to bring about better conditions for the care of the sick and fight a measles epidemic that threatens the city's children.

Alternative versions
The European release of the film has a slightly different ending: British prime minister Neville Chamberlain's voice is heard on the radio in Dr. Prescott's office explaining that Hitler has refused to withdraw his troops from Poland and that a state of war exists with Germany. As the United States had not yet entered World War II, the American release does not contains the radio message, and a shot of Anne Lee and Dr. Prescott reacting to the news was deleted.

Cast
 Carole Lombard as Anne Lee
 Brian Aherne as Dr. Robert Prescott
 Anne Shirley as Lucy Lee
 Julien Mitchell as Matthew Bowley
 Robert Coote as Dr. Caley
 Brenda Forbes as Nora Dunn
 Rita Page as Glennie
 Peter Cushing as Joe Shand
 Ethel Griffies as Matron East
 Doris Lloyd as Mrs. Martha Bowley
 Emily Fitzroy as Sister Gilson
 Donnie Dunagan as Tommy (uncredited)

See also
 List of American films of 1940

References

External links

 
 
 
 

Films based on short fiction
1940 films
Medical-themed films
Films set in London
Films set in the 20th century
American black-and-white films
Films about nurses
Films based on works by A. J. Cronin
Films directed by George Stevens
1940 romantic drama films
American romantic drama films
Films scored by Alfred Newman
RKO Pictures films
1940s English-language films
1940s American films